De Los Santos is a Spanish surname meaning "of the saints". Notable people with the surname include:

Abel De Los Santos (born 1992), American baseball player
Alejandro de los Santos (1902–1982), Argentinian football player
Enyel De Los Santos (born 1995), Dominican Republic baseball player
Epifanio de los Santos (1871–1928), Filipino historian
Fautino de los Santos (born 1986), Dominican Republic baseball player
Gonzalo de los Santos (born 1976), Uruguayan football player 
Jaime de los Santos (born 1946), Filipino general
Ramón de los Santos (born 1949), Dominican Republic baseball player
Valerio de los Santos (born 1972), Dominican Republic baseball player
William de los Santos, (born 1964), actor
Yerry De Los Santos (born 1997), Dominican Republic baseball player

See also
33219 De Los Santos, an asteroid
Epifanio de los Santos Avenue

Spanish-language surnames